A poltergeist is a troublesome spirit or ghost that manifests itself by moving and influencing objects.

Poltergeist may also refer to:

Films
Poltergeist (film series), series of horror films
Poltergeist (1982 film), a horror film
Poltergeist II: The Other Side, 1986 film
Poltergeist III, 1988 film
Poltergeist (2015 film), a remake of the 1982 film

Music
Poltergeist (album), release by death metal band Deathchain
Poltergeist (band), a Swiss thrash metal band that played from the late 1980s to early 1990s
"Poltergeist", a song by Banks from the album The Altar
"Poltergeist", a song by Deftones from the album Koi No Yokan

Other uses
Poltergeist (planet),  the first exoplanet and pulsar planet that was discovered
Regininha Poltergeist (born 1971), Brazilian model, performance artist and actress
Poltergeist (computer programming), short-lived, typically stateless object used to perform initialization or to invoke methods in another, more permanent class
Poltergeist (roller coaster), steel roller coaster located at Six Flags Fiesta Texas in San Antonio, Texas
Poltergeist (video game), an upcoming sequel to Nintendo's video game Geist
Poltergeist: The Legacy, Canadian/American horror television series which ran from 1996 to 1999

See also
 Cowan–Reines neutrino experiment, part of Project Poltergeist, the search for neutrinos